The 1971 Phillip Island 500K was an endurance race for Group E Series Production Touring Cars held at the Phillip Island Grand Prix Circuit in Victoria, Australia on 24 October 1971. The event was staged over a race distance of 106 laps, totalling .  It was Round 4 of the 1971 Australian Manufacturers' Championship.

The race was won by Colin Bond, driving a Holden Torana GTR XU-1.

Classes
The field was divided into five classes according to the assessed CP Units of each car (i.e. engine capacity in litres multiplied by retail price in dollars).

Results

Note: The above table may not show all starters.

References

Further reading
 CAMS Manual of Motor Sport, 1971
 Phillip Island 500K, Australian Motor Manual, January 1972, page 56
 Bond Leads 'Island' Torana Benefit, Modern Motor, January 1972, Page 93
 Ford, The Australian Racing History © 1989
 Holden, The Official Racing History © 1988

Phillip Island 500
Phillip Island 500K
Motorsport at Phillip Island
October 1971 sports events in Australia